Sir Charles Burton, 1st Baronet (1702 – 6 June 1775) was an Anglo-Irish politician. 

Burton was the Member of Parliament for Dublin City in the Irish House of Commons between 1749 and 1760. Between 1752 and 1753 he was Lord Mayor of Dublin. On 2 October 1758 Burton was created a baronet, of Pollacton in the Baronetage of Ireland. He was succeeded in his title by his son, also called Charles.

References

1702 births
1775 deaths
18th-century Anglo-Irish people
Baronets in the Baronetage of Ireland
Irish MPs 1727–1760
Lord Mayors of Dublin
Members of the Parliament of Ireland (pre-1801) for County Dublin constituencies